Okçular is a village in the Eruh District of Siirt Province in Turkey. The village had a population of 1,007 in 2021.

References 

Villages in Eruh District
Kurdish settlements in Siirt Province